Marambo is a rural settlement in the Nachingwea District of the Lindi Region in Tanzania.

Marambo consists of 600 dwellings spread over five villages.

References

Nachingwea District